The 2020 South Korean football season started in May 2020 due to the ongoing COVID-19 pandemic. K League was scheduled to begin on February 29, but the season was suspended until the pandemic slowed. Players must be tested before each match, and are restricted from talking to other players.

Leagues

K League 1

K League 2

K3 League

K4 League

WK-League

Table

Playoff and championship

National teams

South Korea national football team

Kits

Results and fixtures

Friendlies

2022 FIFA World Cup  Qualifying

2023 AFC Asian Cup Qualification

Group H

Ranking of runner-up teams

South Korea U-17 national football team

South Korea U-20 national football team

South Korea U-23 national football team

AFC competitions

AFC Champions League

Group stage

Men's football

References

Seasons in South Korean football